In an educational milieu MSIP can be defined as the either the Manitoba School Improvement Plan or the Multi-Subject Instructional Period.  For the purpose of this article the acronym  MSIP will be used exclusively to refer to the multi-subject instructional period.

The Manitoba School Improvement Project dates from 1994, when it was established as a result of the vision of the Walter and Duncan Gordon Foundation, a Canadian charitable foundation. The Foundation was interested in enhancing education fm was begun. Established initially with a very definite urban focus, the program has in recent years expanded to not only include the province's rural community but other Canadian jurisdictions.

MSIP promotes an alternative academic schedule for high school students. Students in Canada generally attend high schools where the school year is divided into two semesters consisting of four period days.  Class time can vary slightly but most classes last between 70 and 76 minutes. Instead of the standard four 75-minute periods found in the semestered school MSIP schools adopt five 60-minute periods including one 60-minute multi-subject instructional period.

How MSIP works

Students attend their regular four classes each day plus a one-hour supervised MSIP class.  Students in any one MSIP class are arranged in multi-grade formation with varied levels of ability. Their course selections determine their timetable and where the MSIP class will fall.  In many cases the MSIP class begins with 20 minutes of silent literacy work - reading or writing complementing the movement to improve literacy skills. The rest of the period students may use for work on assignments, make up work they missed due to absences or get help in areas where they are falling behind.
Students have the ability to move within the school environment during their MSIP period to seek extra help, use computer and research resources, attend guidance counselling appointments and meet with subject teachers where possible. The flexibility of this format alleviates the disruption normally associated with the typical semesterted schedule.

Structural Benefits
Resources: MSIP increases students’ access to learning resources. During their MSIP, students are allowed to travel to an area like a computer lab to do research, to a science lab to complete an assignment, or see a teacher for academic support. MSIP schools report
that on any given period approximately 5% of students travel to an area outside of the
MSIP class. Schools experiencing timetabling difficulties due to a shortage of lab space and gymnasium facilities have in effect created more facility opportunities with this 5 period system.
 
Timetable Conflicts: One of the early goals of the MSIP schedule was to deal with the increased number of conflicts students were experiencing in a shrinking school. Having 5 slots to place classes reduces the probability of class overlaps.

Educational Benefits

Studies of existing MSIP schools show improvement in students' inductive thinking abilities, improved group interactions skills and an improvement in students’ abilities to memorize information.  For many non-academic students MSIP also provides shorter classes making it easier for students to focus and complete homework in their MSIP class before going home.

 
Student-Centered Learning is a by-product of the MSIP period. The MSIP format demands that students be self-directed and organized each day by creating an environment of student autonomy - students are in charge of their own agenda. Homework, research and even group meetings are scheduled by the student during their MSIP period.  This results in an increased level of responsibility and ownership over their own learning.

Mastering Learning: Research emphasizes the need for “do time” for consolidation of learning; MSIP provides this time. Each day students will have 60 minutes of ‘do time’ to complete homework, prepare for tests, and work on projects and assignments. This time will promote ‘mastering’ learning and prepare students to learn new concepts and skills, thus improving overall performance.

See also 
Chippewa Secondary School
Student Centered Learning
Semestered System
Education in General

References

External links
Lasalle Secondary School
Manitoba School Improvement Plan
Supportive MSIP Research

Educational administration